USS Deyo (DD-989), a Spruance-class destroyer, was a ship of the United States Navy named for Vice Admiral Morton L. Deyo (1887–1973), a veteran destroyerman and distinguished naval gunfire support task force commander of World War II.

Deyo was laid down on 14 October 1977 by Ingalls Shipbuilding, Pascagoula, Miss.; launched on 20 January 1979; and commissioned on 22 March 1980.

History
 

Deyo took part in operations in the Atlantic and Eastern Pacific Oceans, Caribbean and Mediterranean Seas, and the Persian Gulf. The ship first deployed in May 1981, when it was ordered to the Persian Gulf in response to rising tensions in the Middle East.

In July 1987, Deyo deployed to the Mediterranean, North Arabian Sea and the Indian Ocean as part of the Iowa Battleship battle group. The ship returned to the Persian Gulf in July 1989 to support tanker escort duties during Operation Earnest Will.

After completing counter-drug operations in the Caribbean Sea in August 1990, Deyo deployed to the Mediterranean Sea in May 1991 as part of the Forrestal Carrier Battle Group. The ship visited Liverpool, England in 1993, and represented the US during the 50th Anniversary Celebrations of "The Battle of the Atlantic." The destroyer returned to the Mediterranean Sea in 1994 as a member of the George Washington Carrier Battle Group.

In June 1996, Deyo was struck by the Military Sealift Command vehicle cargo ship USNS Gilliland (T-AKR-298) while moored in port at Newport News. A sudden windstorm caused Gilliland to break free of her moorings and cross the harbor, colliding with Deyo and the submarine , moored ahead of Deyo. Deyo suffered the most damage, while Tucson suffered only minor damage.

In June 1998, Deyo again deployed for the Mediterranean Sea, becoming the first American ship to serve as flagship for Standing Naval Force Mediterranean.

During its final deployment in December 2002 with the Harry S Truman Carrier Battle Group, Deyo was one of the first ships to fire Tomahawk cruise missiles on Iraqi targets during Operation Iraqi Freedom.

Deyo is unique for being the only Spruance-class destroyer armed with armored box launchers that were later upgraded to the Mk 41 VLS.

Fate
Deyo was decommissioned on 6 November 2003 at NS Norfolk, Virginia. She was stricken from the Navy list on 6 April 2004, and was sunk as a target in a fleet training exercise, 25 August 2005.

Gallery

References

External links 

cffc.navy.mil: Deyo Decommissioned After 23 Years

Spruance-class destroyers
Cold War destroyers of the United States
1979 ships
Maritime incidents in 1996
Ships sunk as targets
Maritime incidents in 2005